George Barringer (May 2, 1906 – September 2, 1946) was an American racecar driver, active during the 1930s and 1940s. Barringer made 17 Championship Car starts with a best finish of second at Springfield in August 1935 and Milwaukee in August 1939. In 1941, Barringer debuted a revolutionary rear-engined racecar at the Indianapolis 500; he only placed 32nd after a garage fire destroyed the car before the race began. He and George Robson were killed in the same multicar pile-up at the Lakewood Speedway in Atlanta, Georgia.

Indianapolis 500 results

References
Profile at Motorsport Memorial

1906 births
1946 deaths
Indianapolis 500 drivers
People from Wichita Falls, Texas
Racing drivers from Texas
Racing drivers who died while racing
Sports deaths in Georgia (U.S. state)